Raimo Manninen (3 October 1940, in Lahti – 6 February 2009, in Janakkala) was a Finnish alpine skier who competed in the 1964 Winter Olympics and 1968 Winter Olympics.

External links
 sports-reference.com

1940 births
2009 deaths
Finnish male alpine skiers
Olympic alpine skiers of Finland
Alpine skiers at the 1964 Winter Olympics
Alpine skiers at the 1968 Winter Olympics
Sportspeople from Lahti